Holywell Halt railway station is on the Embsay and Bolton Abbey Steam Railway in North Yorkshire, England.

History 
The halt was the first extension on the railway. The location is called Holywell. The halt was constructed so passengers could view the Craven Fault geological site.

The area is designated a Site of Special Scientific Interest and can also be viewed from the railway line itself. The extension was built largely by volunteers and other organisations who helped out at different stages of the project.

The station was opened in 1987 by the Marquess of Hartington. Holywell Halt had never previously existed when the line formed part of the national rail network.

Information 
The Holywell Halt site is located right next to the A59 main road to Harrogate. The site consists of:
 A picnic site
 A railway viewing platform
 An information display and viewing area of the Craven Fault

See also 
Skipton (Proposed)
Embsay
Bolton Abbey
Stoneacre
Addingham (Proposed)

External links 
A history of the Embsay Railway
A Photo-gallery of Holywell Halt

Heritage railway stations in North Yorkshire
Craven District
Railway stations in Great Britain opened in 1987
Railway stations built for UK heritage railways